Im Jin-ah (born September 14, 1991), known professionally as Nana, is a South Korean singer, actress and model known for her work as a group member of the South Korean girl group After School and its subgroups, Orange Caramel and After School Red. As an actress, Nana starred in various television dramas such as Love Weaves Through a Millennium (2015), The Good Wife (2016), Kill It (2019), and Justice (2019).

Early life
Nana was born on September 14, 1991. She graduated from Ochang High School in Cheongju, and was a participant in the 2009 Asia Pacific Super Model Contest.

Career

2009–2013: Debut with After School and Orange Caramel
In November 2009, Nana debuted in After School along with Raina as third generation members with the release of After School's second EP, Because of You. In June 2010, Nana, along with After School members Raina and Lizzy, formed a sub-unit called Orange Caramel.

In July 2011, Nana was part of the After School sub-unit A.S. Red along with After School members Kahi, Jungah and Uee, releasing the single "In the Night Sky". In September 2011, she was chosen as the main model for the Tokyo Girls Collection fashion show.

In March 2012, Nana again modeled for the Tokyo Girls Collection, walking the S/S 2012 show. She was also a model for the Japanese fashion show Girls' Award and Park Yoon-yoo's Seoul Fashion Walk S/S 2012. In June 2012, After School released their fifth maxi-single Flashback. Nana has a solo song on it titled "Eyeline". In December she joined fellow K-pop stars Hyolyn, Hyuna, Hyoseong, and Nicole to form super group Dazzling Red for SBS Gayo Daejun, performing the song "This Person". She also became the endorsement model for the biggest diet brand in Korea, Juvis. Nana was also a permanent panelist on the Japanese fashion TV show, Tokyo Brandnew Girls.

In 2013, she walked the runway for a-nation's “NYLON” fashion show. The same year, Nana collaborated with Electroboyz on their single "Ma Boy 3". In December 2013, Nana gained global recognition when she placed second on the Independent Critics List of 100 Most Beautiful Faces of 2013. She rose to the #1 position in 2014, and placed first again in 2015.

2014–present: Acting career
In March 2014, it was announced that Nana would be a member on a new SBS variety show called Roommate. The show features 11 celebrities living in one house. In April, Nana became the host for the second season of OnStyle's Style Log, along with Hong Jong-hyun and Cho Min-ho. In August 2014, Nana participated in the Chinese fashion elimination show Muse Dress, and emerged runner-up in the competition. She also had a cameo role in the Korean film Fashion King, which was released on November 6, 2014.

In early 2015 Nana debuted as an actress, starring in the Chinese television drama, Love Weaves Through a Millennium, a remake of the Korean drama Queen In-hyun's Man (2012). The same year, she starred in the Chinese romantic comedy film Go Lala Go 2, the sequel to Go Lala Go!.

In February 2016, Nana joined the cast of Real Men for the fourth season's female soldier special. Later in the year, she was cast in a supporting role in the television drama The Good Wife, a remake of the American series of the same name Nana earned positive reviews for her role as Kim Dan, and received the Rookie Actress award at the 2016 Asia Artist Awards. Following her success on the small screen, Nana was cast alongside her The Good Wife co-star, Yoo Ji-tae in the crime comedy film, The Swindlers (Conman), as the only female lead. The film garnered 213,185 admissions on the first day of its release and topped the local box office for three consecutive weeks.

In 2017, she was cast in her first leading role for upcoming romantic thriller Four Men, but decided to leave the cast due to delays in production.

 

In 2019, Nana starred in OCN's crime drama Kill It, playing detective Do Hyun-jin. The same year, she starred in KBS's melodrama Justice, based on the web novel Justice, written by Jang Ho and illustrated by Elja, as prosecutor Seo Yeon-ah. Nana once again received acclaim, earning herself an Excellence Award from the 2019 KBS Drama Awards.

In 2020, Nana was announced to star in a  mystery thriller film Confession, based on a Spanish film Contratiempo (The Invisible Guest), alongside So Ji-sub and Yunjin Kim. In April 2020 it was announced Nana would join Park Sung-hoon as the lead actress for KBS's upcoming drama Into The Ring. The drama gathered anticipation due to the series being based on the screenplay by Moon Hyun-kyung, the grand prize winner at the Broadcasting Content Promotion Foundation (BCPF)'s 10th Find the Desert's Shooting Star Screenplay Competition, held in 2018. Nana also made her return to music after 6 years through the drama with the release of her first OST, "Our Memories in Summer" (우리의 여름처럼) with co-star Park Sung-hoon. On September 7, it was confirmed that Nana would star in a new MBC drama Oh My Ladylord with Lee Min-ki set to premiere on March 24, 2021.

After the completion of Oh My Ladylord, it was announced on May 28 of 2021 that Nana was cast in Netflix upcoming series Glitch as "Heo Bora" alongside actress Jeon Yeo-been.

On December 8, 2021, Nana renewed her contract with Pledis Entertainment for the second time.

Discography

Singles

Filmography

Film

Television series

Web series

Television shows

Awards and nominations

Notes

References

External links

1991 births
21st-century South Korean singers
21st-century South Korean women singers
After School (band) members
K-pop singers
Living people
Orange Caramel members
People from Cheongju
Pledis Entertainment artists
South Korean female idols
South Korean female models
South Korean women pop singers
South Korean film actresses
South Korean television actresses
Hybe Corporation artists